Ana Carolina de Castro Muniz (born March 14, 1984) is a freestyle swimmer from Brazil.

At the 1999 Pan American Games in Winnipeg, she won the bronze medal in the 4×200-metre freestyle. She also finished 5th in the 400-metre freestyle, 6th in the 200-metre freestyle, and 6th in the 800-metre freestyle.

In November 1999, she broke the short-course South American record of the 200-metre freestyle, with a time of 2:01.09.

In December 1999, Muniz broke the South American record of the 800-metre freestyle, with a time of 8:48.53.

In 1999, she was also South American record holder of the 400-metre freestyle, with a time of 4:16.32.

At the 2000 FINA World Swimming Championships (25 m), in Athens, Muniz finished 9th in the 4×200-metre freestyle, where she broke the South American record, with a time of 8:18.87, along with Monique Ferreira, Tatiana Lemos and Paula Baracho. She also finished 19th in the 400-metre freestyle, and 23rd in the 200-metre freestyle.

At the 2002 South American Games, in Belém, she won a gold medal in the 200-metre freestyle, silver in the 400-metre freestyle, and bronze in the 800-metre freestyle.

Participating in the 2003 World Aquatics Championships, in Barcelona, she finished 12th in the 4×200-metre freestyle.

She won the silver medal in the women's 4×200-metre freestyle relay at the 2003 Pan American Games in Santo Domingo, Dominican Republic, where she broke the South American record, with a time of 8:10.54, along with Monique Ferreira, Mariana Brochado and Paula Baracho. Muniz also finished 6th in the 800-metre freestyle.

References

1984 births
Living people
Brazilian female freestyle swimmers
Swimmers at the 1999 Pan American Games
Swimmers at the 2003 Pan American Games
People from Campo Grande
Pan American Games silver medalists for Brazil
Pan American Games bronze medalists for Brazil
Pan American Games medalists in swimming
South American Games gold medalists for Brazil
South American Games silver medalists for Brazil
South American Games bronze medalists for Brazil
South American Games medalists in swimming
Competitors at the 2002 South American Games
Medalists at the 1999 Pan American Games
Medalists at the 2003 Pan American Games
Sportspeople from Mato Grosso do Sul
21st-century Brazilian women
20th-century Brazilian women